Gherasim Rudi (4 March 1907 – 26 June 1982) also Russified as Gerasim Yakovlevich Rud was a Moldavian SSR politician and member of the Moldovan resistance during World War II.

Rudi was born in Sărăţei, Rîbnița District. He died on 26 June 1982, in Chişinău.  Rudi was the Prime Minister of Moldavian SSR (5 January 1946 – 23 January 1958); until 4 April, the name was Chairmen of the Council of People's Commissars. Rudi signed the ruling concerning the deportation of more than 40,000 of Bessarabian Romanians to Siberia in the summer of 1949. The operation was undertaken by the NKVD, under the order of Joseph Stalin, on 6 June 1949 and was known as the operation "Iug" (South). After retirement he was a Rector of the Chisinau Agricultural Institute.

Bibliography
 Chişinău-enciclopedie (1997)

External links
 
 Рудь Герасим Яковлевич

 

1907 births
1982 deaths
People from Rîbnița District
People from Baltsky Uyezd
Central Committee of the Communist Party of the Soviet Union candidate members
Members of the Supreme Soviet of the Soviet Union
Members of the Central Committee of the Communist Party of Moldavia
Heads of government of the Moldavian Soviet Socialist Republic
People's commissars and ministers of the Moldavian Soviet Socialist Republic
Recipients of the Order of Lenin
Recipients of the Order of Friendship of Peoples
Recipients of the Order of Bogdan Khmelnitsky (Soviet Union), 1st class
Politicide perpetrators